The United States Post Office in Hollywood, Los Angeles, California, also known as Hollywood Station, is an active U.S. post office located at 1615 Wilcox, between Sunset and Hollywood Boulevards. It is on the National Register of Historic Places.

Design
In 1937, renowned Art Deco architect Claud Beelman, a partner at Curlett + Beelman, was commissioned by the Works Progress Administration (WPA) to design the Hollywood Post Office Building. He worked with the Los Angeles architectural firm Allison & Allison.  Beelman also designed the Los Angeles County Fair Gallery, also commissioned by the WPA in 1937, now known as the Millard Sheets Center for the Arts at Fairplex.

A wooden bas-relief for interior lobby, titled "The Horseman", was carved by artist Gordon Newell as a Treasury Relief Art Project commission. It is still in the building, located over a doorway.

Using a steam shovel, the ground breaking was done by Will H. Hays of the Motion Picture Production Code. The post office is one of the few historic government buildings remaining relatively unchanged in Hollywood.

See also 

 List of Los Angeles Historic-Cultural Monuments in Hollywood
 List of Registered Historic Places in Los Angeles

List of United States post offices

References 

1930s architecture in the United States
1937 establishments in California
Allison & Allison buildings
Art Deco architecture in California
Buildings and structures in Hollywood, Los Angeles
Government buildings completed in 1937
Los Angeles Historic-Cultural Monuments
Hollywood
Treasury Relief Art Project
Works Progress Administration in California